is a Japanese footballer who plays for Machida Zelvia.

Club statistics
Updated to End of 2018 season.

References

External links

Profile at Renofa Yamaguchi FC

1993 births
Living people
People from Toyota, Aichi
Waseda University alumni
Association football people from Aichi Prefecture
Japanese footballers
J2 League players
Renofa Yamaguchi FC players
FC Machida Zelvia players
Association football defenders
Universiade bronze medalists for Japan
Universiade medalists in football